Qiaozhuang East railway station is a railway station on the Sub-Central line in Yuqiao Subdistrict, Tongzhou District. It is a terminus with a single island platform. The station was opened on 20 June 2019 and is situated on former railway sidings.

Services
Qiaozhuang East railway station has an infrequent service to either Beijing West or Liangxiang.

References 

Railway stations in Beijing
Railway stations in China opened in 2019